Starwood Capital Group is an investment firm headquartered in Miami Beach, Florida. It is managed by Barry Sternlicht. It was co-founded by Sternlicht and Robert Faith in 1991. In 1993, Faith left Starwood to found Greystar Real Estate Partners.

History 
In 1991, at the age of 31, Sternlicht launched the firm to buy apartment buildings that were being sold by the Resolution Trust Corporation, created by the federal government to hold and liquidate the real estate assets owned by failed banks after the savings and loan crisis. Sternlicht raised $20 million from the families of William Bernard Ziff Jr. and Carter Burden of New York to fund these purchases.

In 1993, the company contributed the apartment portfolio to Sam Zell's Equity Residential in exchange for a 20% stake in the company.

In 1994, in partnership with Goldman Sachs, the company purchased Westin Hotels & Resorts in a $561 million transaction. In January 1995, Starwood purchased Hotel Investors Trust, an almost-bankrupt real estate investment trust, and in 2005, acquired Groupe du Louvre, which owned crystal maker Baccarat. Groupe de Louvre was sold in 2015, but Baccarat was retained by Starwood.

In 2009, a consortium led by Starwood Capital bought 40% of the loan portfolio of Corus Bankshares, which suffered from bank failure. In 2010, the company lost an auction to buy Extended Stay Hotels, which was in bankruptcy. Starwood unsuccessfully filed an objection against the sale to Centerbridge Partners with the bankruptcy court in Manhattan. In the same year, Starwood received a majority ownership stake in Riviera Holdings, owners of the Riviera hotel and casino in Las Vegas, Nevada and Riviera Black Hawk in Black Hawk, Colorado, after a bankruptcy reorganization.

In 2012, the company began construction of a chain of hotels under the name of Baccarat Hotels and Resorts, featuring crystal chandeliers from Baccarat. In 2015, the firm sold its flagship Baccarat hotel in New York City. In the same year, the group partnered with Toll Brothers to develop the Pierhouse at Brooklyn Bridge Park.

In December 2013, Starwood Global Opportunity Fund IX, in partnership with Vencom, bought 7 retail properties from the Swedish retail group Kooperativa Förbundet for 3.9 billion Swedish kronor, or $593.3 million, and sold these in 2016 and 2017. That year, the company acquired seven malls from Westfield Group, including Great Northern Mall in North Olmsted and Franklin Park Mall in Toledo, with properties in Indiana, California and Washington, together dubbed Starwood West.

Between 2013 and 2014, Starwood also acquired three British hospitality groups: De Vere Group for 232 million, Four-Pillars Hotels for 90 million, and Principal Hayley Group for 360 million.

In February 2014, Starwood Property Trust spun off Starwood Waypoint Residential Trust, a single-family rental real estate investment trust. In January 2016, Starwood Waypoint Residential Trust merged with Colony American Homes, creating Colony Starwood Homes. In 2017, it was merged into Invitation Homes. 

In March 2014, the firm acquired a stake in the A.S. Roma football club, and in October 2014, Starwood purchased 7 upscale malls in Virginia, Florida, North Carolina, Texas, and Michigan from Taubman Centers in a $1.4 billion transaction.

In 2016, the company acquired 23,262 apartments from Equity Residential for $5.365 billion.

In September 2017, Starwood invested $250 million in YOTEL for a 30% stake.

In 2021, Starwood's mall holdings had decreased from thirty to eight with the impact of the COVID-19 pandemic on the retail industry, and the company selling some properties at a loss to reduce its $2 billion in CMBS mortgage debt.

In 2022, CEO Sternlicht voiced strong criticism of the Federal Reserve for creating calamitous economic conditions by needlessly raising interest rates.

Notable real estate investments

References 

Financial services companies established in 1991
1991 establishments in Florida
Companies based in Fairfield County, Connecticut
Greenwich, Connecticut
Investment companies of the United States
Privately held companies based in Connecticut
Real estate companies of the United States